{{Infobox newspaper
| name                 = Sydsvenska Dagbladet Snällposten
| logo                 = Sydsvenskan logo.svg
| image                = Kvarteret Kaninen, Malmö 2014.jpg
| image_size           = 250px
| caption              = Sydsvenskans headquarters in Malmö.
| type                 = Daily newspaper
| format               = Compact
| owners               = Bonnier Group
| chiefeditor          = Pia Rehnquist
| foundation           = 
| language             = Swedish
| headquarters         = Malmö, Sweden
| circulation          = 99,800 (2013)
| ISSN                 = 1652-814X
| oclc                 =
| website              = www.sydsvenskan.se
}}Sydsvenska Dagbladet Snällposten,  generally known simply as Sydsvenskan''' (The South Swedish), is a daily newspaper published in Scania in Sweden.

History and profileSydsvenskan was founded in 1870. In 1871 the paper merged with Snällposten which was started in 1848. Sydsvenskan is headquartered in Malmö and mostly distributed in southern Scania. Its coverage is characterized by local news from southwest Scania in addition to a full coverage of national, EU, and international news. The paper is owned by the Bonnier Group which bought it in 1994.

It was one of the Swedish publications which featured news materials provided by the Swedish Intelligence Agency during World War II. Until 1966, Sydsvenskan had close ties to the Rightist Party (now Moderate Party). In the Swedish debate about the country's role in the EU and in relation to the Eurozone, the paper has emphasized the importance of a closer political, economical, and cultural affiliation to Europe. Its stated editorial position is "independent liberal".

The newspaper changed its format from broadsheet to compact format on 5 October 2004.

Introduction and then removal of paywallSydsvenskan introduced a soft paywall in February 2013. Those who did not have a paper subscription could view a maximum of 20 free articles per month. A year after, this was changed to 5 articles per week. Subscription models were available from 28 Swedish kronor, with the cheapest one giving full access to the website. In August 2014, this was raised to 59 Swedish kronor (around US$7.10), as the former price was an introductory price. A year after the introduction of the paywall, 60,000 subscribers had created accounts on the website and 4,000 had purchased a digital subscription.

In January 2016, Sydsvenskan removed the paywall, with the editor-in-chief Pia Rehnquist saying that having a paywall had led to a general belief that you had to pay to read the website. She also said that the digital part is going well but they thought it would better to reach more readers.

Acquisition of Helsingborgs Dagblad
In the end of April 2014, Sydsvenskan acknowledged their intention to buy Helsingborgs Dagblad. A deal was reached in the end of May and the Swedish Competition Authority approved it around two weeks after. A strong reason was reported to be that both newspapers had seen their ad revenue decrease heavily.

Circulation

In 1998 the circulation of Sydsvenskan'' was 125,000 copies on weekdays and 146,000 copies on Sundays. The paper had a circulation of 129,300 copies on weekdays in 2005. It was 94,800 copies in 2012. The circulation of the paper was 99,800 copies in 2013.

See also
 List of newspapers in Sweden

References

External links
 Sydsvenskan

1870 establishments in Sweden
Bonnier Group
Mass media in Malmö
Daily newspapers published in Sweden
Publications established in 1870
Swedish-language newspapers
Swedish news websites